Treva Spontaine and The Graphic, later The Graphic was a Greensboro, North Carolina indie band popular in colleges of the southeast USA during the 1980s. In 1984 Don Dixon  produced the 6-track album People In Glass for Treva Spontaine and The Graphic. People In Glass was reissued in 1985 in Denmark as Way of the World.

Discography

People In Glass
"Way of the World" – 3:58 (Brad Newell)
"Magical Equation" – 3:30 (Newell)
"It's My Dance" – 3:55 (Newell)
"It's Lonely Out Here" – 4:15 (Newell)
"Entrer Dans L'Amour" – 4:35 (Newell)
"I Dream Alone" – 2:22 (Tréva Spontaine)

Credits:
Drums: Jim Hoyle
Bass/Vocals: Dwight Mabe
Guitars/Keyboards/Vocals: Brad Newell
Vocals/Guitars: Treva Spontaine
Produced and Recorded by Don Dixon at Reflection Sound Studios, Charlotte, NC
Additional percussion: Gary Collins
Sax: Dixonics
Mastered by Greg Calbi at Sterling Sound, NYC
Blended by Don Dixon
Band photo: Laura Levine
Cover design: Bob Murray
Thanks to: Wayne Jerrigan, Steve Haigler, Anne Echerd, Susan Needham, R. Tim Embry

The track "Magical Equation" earned air play on regional campus radio.   The track "Entrer Dans L'Amour" is unusual for a North Carolina band since it is in French. Treva Spontaine previously played in two Chapel Hill Bands, Treva and Graham Forge.

External links
efolkmusic
last.fm

Musical groups from North Carolina